Anthony Stapley (born 30 August 1590 – buried 31 January 1655) was one of the regicides of King Charles I of England.

Stapley was M.P. for New Shoreham (1624–1625), Lewes (1628), Sussex (1640, 1653–1654). He was colonel and governor of Chichester (1642–1645) and signed the death-warrant of Charles I. He was a member of Council of State in 1649–1653, vice-admiral of Sussex in 1650 and a member of interim council and of supreme assembly in 1653.

Biography
Stapley was baptised at Framfield on 30 August 1590, was the son of Anthony Stapley of Framfield, Sussex, by his third wife, Ann, daughter of John Thatcher of Priesthawes, Sussex. The Stapley family removed about 1615 from Framfield to Patcham. Anthony about 1640 gave £10 to the new building at Christ's College, Cambridge, and was probably educated there.

Stapley represented the borough of New Shoreham in the parliaments of 1624 (elected 21 January 1624) and of 1625 (elected 2 May), and the borough of Lewes in that of 1628 (elected 26 February 1628), having unseated Sir George Rivers by petition. He was returned both for the county of Sussex and for the borough of Lewes to the Short Parliament in March 1640, when he elected to sit for the county. He was again chosen by the county on 22 October 1640 to sit in the Long Parliament, and represented it in the Barebones Parliament of 1653 and the First Protectorate Parliament of 1654.

In January 1640 Stapley, then a justice of the peace, was reported to Dr. William Bray, Archbishop Laud's chaplain, as causing trouble to the churches by his puritan leanings. On the outbreak of the English Civil War he received a colonel's commission in the parliamentary army, and was present at the siege of Chichester in December 1642 under Sir William Waller. He was left as governor of the town and garrison when Waller moved on to the siege of Arundel Castle. On 22 September 1643 he took the covenant. At the beginning of 1644 he raised objections to the quartering in the town of some of Waller's horse. The dispute was referred to a committee of the House of Commons, and finally to the committee of both kingdoms on 26 February. He was ordered by both bodies to observe Waller's commands. While detained in London he was exonerated from all blame in the event of disaster at Chichester. He resumed the command of the town and garrison at the termination of the proceedings early in March. He retained his governorship till 1645, when he was succeeded by Colonel Algernon Sidney. In January 1644 he was deputy lieutenant of the county of Sussex.

Stapley was one of the commissioners who sat in judgement on Charles I during his trial for high treason. Stapley was present at Westminster Hall on 27 January 1649 when sentence was pronounced, and signed the death-warrant on 29 January. He was elected a member of the first Council of State of the Commonwealth on 17 February 1649 (when he signed the engagement), and re-elected on 17 February 1649–1650, 25 November 1651, 30 November 1652, and 9 July 1653. He was one of Cromwell's interim council of thirteen (29 April to 14 July 1653), and of the supreme assembly called on 6 June 1653. He had joined the admiralty committee of the committee of both kingdoms on 6 June 1649, was nominated vice-admiral for the county of Sussex on 22 February 1650, and took the oath of secrecy the following day. He died early in 1655, and was buried at Patcham on 31 January. At the Restoration he was one of the regicides notified as dead, and excepted from the act of Pardon and Oblivion of 6 June 1660 (which meant that his estate was subject to confiscation).

Family
Stapley married Ann, daughter of George Goring of Danny, and sister of George, Lord Goring. She was buried at Patcham on 11 November 1637. By her Stapley had three sons and one daughter. Stapley married a second wife, "Dame Anne Clarke", who predeceased him on 15 January 1654. Sir John Stapley (1628–1701), the second but eldest surviving son abandoned the political views of his father, became entangled in a plot for the return of Charles II as did his brother Antony.

Notes

References
Attribution

 cites:
Berry's County Genealogy—Sussex, p. 85;
Sussex Archæological Collections, i. 36, iv. 300, v. 88–91, xvi. 78, 108–9, 113, 116, 119–20;
Masson's Milton, iv. 13, 224, 354, 446, 501, 505, 523;
Commons' Journals, i. 878, iii. 362, 401, 403, 616, vi. 146, vii. 37, 42, 303, viii. 61;
Official List of Members of Parliament;
Cal. of State Papers, Dom. 1639 to 1654 passim;
Vicars's Jehovah-Jireh, pp. 234–40;
Dallaway's Western Sussex, vol. i. pp. 14, 20, vol. II. pt. i. p. 28;
Rushworth's Memorials, III. ii. 480;
Nalson's Trial of Charles I;
Mark Noble, Lives of the Regicides, pp. 240–6;
Thomas Walker Horsfield's Sussex, ii. app. pp. 49, 55;
Thurlow State Papers (Birch), passim;
Macrae's Cal. of Clarendon State Papers, iii. 281, 312, 358, 374, 388–9, 405;
Clarendon's Hist. of the Rebellion (Macrae), vi. 58–9, 63;
Burke's Extinct Baronetage;
P. C. C. 189 (Aylett);
Registers of Patcham, Addit. MS. 5698, f. 118.

Further reading
 

1590 births
1655 deaths
People from Framfield
Regicides of Charles I
English MPs 1624–1625
English MPs 1625
English MPs 1628–1629
English MPs 1640 (April)
English MPs 1640–1648
English MPs 1653 (Barebones)
English MPs 1654–1655